State Road 585 (NM 585), is a  state highway in Taos County, New Mexico, United States, that runs along Paseo Del Cañon East and connects New Mexico State Road 68 (NM 68) in Taos with U.S. Route 64 (US 64) east of Taos.

Route description

NM 585 begins at a traffic light–controlled intersection with NM 68 (Paseo Del Pueblo Sur) in southwestern Taos, immediately north of the Taos Visitor Center. NM 68 heads north–northeast to end at US 64 in northern Taos. NM 68 heads southwesterly toward Ranchos De Taos, Velarde, and Española.) Curving slightly to the north, it continues east–southeast for about another  to a roundabout with the north (west) end of Weimer Road. (Weimer Road forms a southern loop off of NM 585.) After the westbound lanes (only) connect with the west end of Calle Palomita, NM 585 has another roundabout, this time with the south end of Camino de Colores.

Heading east from its third roundabout, NM 585 narrows to a two–lane road before connecting with the south end of Camino De La Cruz. After continuing east for about  NM 585 crossed Cruz Alta Road/Weimer Road, with Cruz Alta Road on the north and the north (east) end of Weimer Road on the south. After about another , NM 585 leaves Taos and enters an unincorporated area of Taos County. About  farther east, NM 585 curves to head northeast before connecting with the east end of Witt Road. Promptly thereafter, reaches its eastern terminus at US 64 at a T intersection. (US 64 heads east toward Angel Fire, Eagle Nest, and Raton.)

History
NM 585 was created in 1988 as a renumbering of a spur of NM 68.

Major intersections

See also

 List of state roads in New Mexico

References

External links

585
Transportation in Taos County, New Mexico